Silent Letter is the eighth studio album by American folk rock duo America, released by Capitol Records in June 1979.

This was the first America studio album following the departure of Dan Peek, the first America release on Capitol Records, the last albumand last of seven consecutivewhich longtime Beatles producer George Martin produced with America.

It was also their first studio album since their debut to have a title beginning with a letter other than "H".  The title itself acknowledges the missing "H" by its wry reference to silent letters in the English language.

The album contains fast-paced disco songs, piano-based power ballads (often sung by Gerry Beckley) and mid-tempo pop rock songs.

Reception
In his Allmusic retrospective review, music critic Steven Thomas Erlewine noted the band's transition from "folky California soft rock" to adult contemporary. He wrote of the album: "The end result may be flawed, but in an enjoyable way. And compared to the records that preceded it and some of albums that followed it, Silent Letter certainly seems like a latter-day highlight for America."

The album was not a commercial success, reaching only number 110 on the Billboard album chart. However, it did produce three minor hit singles. "Only Game in Town" bubbled under the Hot 100 chart, peaking at # 107. "All My Life" and "All Around" narrowly missed the Top 40 on the Adult Contemporary chart, peaking at # 48 & 45 respectively. The former was a big hit in Asia.

Track listing

Personnel
America
Gerry Beckley – vocals, guitars, keyboards
Dewey Bunnell – vocals, guitars
with:
Mike Woods –  lead guitar
David Dickey – bass
Willie Leacox – drums
Jim Calire – keyboards, saxophone solo
Tom Walsh – percussion

Charts

References

1979 albums
America (band) albums
Albums produced by George Martin
Capitol Records albums
Albums recorded at AIR Studios